Bouizakarne (Tashlhit (Latin script): Bu-izakarn, (Berber/Tifinagh script): ⴱⵓ-ⵉⵣⴰⴽⴰⵔⵏ, Arabic: بو يزكارن) is a town in the Guelmim Province, Guelmim-Oued Noun in southern Morocco. In the 2014 census, it had a population of 14,228, the fifth-largest in the region and second-highest in the province after the regional capital Guelmim. 

Bouizakarne lies at the junction of the N1 and N12 highways, with the N1 linking it to the nearby Souss-Massa region to the north and Guelmim to the southwest.
Since Bouizakarne is close to Souss-Massa region, the town's surrounding Anti-Atlas mountains are covered with argan trees.

Notable people 
Driss Benzekri - Former international goalkeeper

References

Populated places in Guelmim Province
Municipalities of Morocco